Suddenly Susan is an American television sitcom that aired on NBC from September 19, 1996, to December 26, 2000. The series was created by Clyde Phillips and starred Brooke Shields in her first regular series. Shields played Susan Keane, a glamorous San Francisco magazine writer who begins to adjust to being single, and who learns to be independent-minded after having been taken care of all her life. The series was developed by Gary Dontzig and Steven Peterman, who also served as executive producers during the first three seasons, and was produced by Warner Bros. Television.

Synopsis
Susan Keane (Brooke Shields) has always been taken care of by someone else. She worked as a copy editor at The Gate, a fictional San Francisco magazine. On her wedding day, she realizes that she and her wealthy, vain fiancé, Kip, are not meant for each other and that there is more to life than just being known as the "s" in "The Kip Richmonds." She abruptly leaves him at the altar. Now, she's suddenly just Susan. Susan's parents, played by guest stars Swoosie Kurtz and Ray Baker, were less than ecstatic about their daughter deciding to end her engagement to Kip, though her grandmother and confidant, Nana (Barbara Barrie) stands as a pillar of support for Susan.

The day after the wedding, Susan goes to her boss, Jack Richmond (Judd Nelson), the rebellious brother of Susan's former fiancé, Kip, begging for her job back. Instead, Jack assigns Susan to write a regular column about being suddenly single. Susan's coworkers include photographer Luis Rivera (Nestor Carbonell), boyish rock music reporter Todd Stities (David Strickland), restaurant critic Vicki Groener (Kathy Griffin), and, in later episodes, investigative reporter and Susan's old enemy Maddy Piper (Andréa Bendewald).

In the show's final season, The Gate is taken over by Ian Maxtone-Graham (Eric Idle) and overhauled into a men's magazine that's run out of an old warehouse in Chinatown. Along with this, Ian brings his own team of workers, including executive assistant and U.S. Navy veteran Miranda Charles (Sherri Shepherd), sports writer Nate Knaborski (Currie Graham), and freelance photographer Oliver Browne (Rob Estes). Susan is faced with a new set of problems and has to prove herself all over again.

Besides the task of putting together a magazine and focusing on the lead character's life, Suddenly Susan also focuses on the private lives of many employees in the show.

Cast 
 Brooke Shields as Susan Keane
 Nestor Carbonell as Luis Rivera (Susan's co-worker)
 Kathy Griffin as Vicki Groener (Susan's co-worker) 
 Barbara Barrie as Helen 'Nana' Keane (Susan's grandmother)
 Judd Nelson as Jack Richmond (Susan's boss)
 David Strickland as Todd Stites (Susan's co-worker)
 Andrea Bendewald as Maddy Piper (Susan's co-worker)
 Sherri Shepherd as Miranda Charles 
 Eric Idle as Ian Maxtone-Graham

The character portrayed by Idle is not connected in any way with the television writer of the same name.

Episodes

Season 1 (1996–97)

Season 2 (1997–98)

Season 3 (1998–99)

Season 4 (1999–2000)

Original pilot 
In the show's original pilot, written by Billy Van Zandt and Jane Milmore and based on a dramatic script by Clyde Phillips, Susan worked at a publishing house editing children's books. After breaking up with her live-in boyfriend Ted (Brian McNamara), Susan finds herself "single" for the first time in years. Concurrently, Susan faces even greater challenges at work when her boss, Eric (Philip Casnoff), assigns her the task of working as an editor with Charlotte (Elizabeth Ashley), a hugely successful and highly opinionated romance novelist. Always on hand to provide support is Susan's grandmother, Nana (Nancy Marchand), her co-workers, acerbic best friend Marcy (Maggie Wheeler) and Neil (David Krumholtz), who has a crush on Susan.

When the series was picked up, Brian McNamara's "Ted" character did not return, though McNamara did later play the part of Cooper Elliot, who took Susan to Italy at the end of season one. Other changes between the pilot and the series were Barbara Barrie replacing Nancy Marchand in the role of Nana, while Swoosie Kurtz and Ray Baker replaced Kurt Fuller and Caroline McWilliams as Susan's parents, Bill and Liz. In the series, though the setting switches from a publishing house to a magazine, the main office set retained most of its features from the pilot; the most noticeable difference was that the elevator was to the right.  While the pilot's storyline featuring Elizabeth Ashley as one of the publishing house's clients was not used in the series, a cardboard cut out of Ashley that was featured in the pilot appears throughout the first three seasons of the show – it can be seen briefly behind Susan's desk, near the filing cabinets along the back wall.

The actual location for the exterior shots of the office was the Newhall Building at 260 California Street in San Francisco.

Death of David Strickland 

David Strickland died by suicide in a Las Vegas hotel room on March 22, 1999. Strickland's death was later incorporated into the show's third season finale, which killed off his character, Todd Stites. Todd has gone missing, and throughout the episode, Susan desperately tries to find him. As the episode progresses, Susan learns about a number of good deeds that Todd had done around his neighborhood that she never knew about. Out-of-character interviews with the supporting cast also appear throughout the episode, with each actor sharing their personal experiences they had with Strickland before his death. As the episode comes to an end, Todd's favorite song, "Praise You" by Fatboy Slim, plays outside in the street as Susan and her co-workers sit in a circle praying for Todd's well-being. At last, the phone in the middle of the room rings, but the camera cuts away before the news of Todd's fate can be revealed. The episode ends with an archive video footage of Strickland and its titles: "The Gods of comedy looked down upon you and smiled".

Fourth season and cancellation 

At the beginning of the fourth and final season, Judd Nelson and Andrea Bendewald left the show; series developers and executive producers Steven Peterman and Gary Dontzig also left the series, and the show replaced almost its entire writing staff (with the exception of new co-showrunner Maria Semple, who joined the series the previous season). The Gate was transformed into a men's magazine by its new owner, Ian Maxtone-Graham (Eric Idle), and relocated from its trendy uptown offices overlooking the bay to a dingy former warehouse in Chinatown. In tow, Ian brought his own team of workers, including executive assistant and U.S. Navy veteran Miranda Charles (Sherri Shepherd), sports writer Nate Knaborski (Currie Graham), and freelance photographer Oliver Browne (Rob Estes). Faced with new challenges, Susan suddenly had to prove herself all over again.

Airing between Seinfeld and ER during its first season, Suddenly Susan was initially a ratings success, attracting almost 25 million viewers per episode, despite mostly unfavorable critical reviews.  When the show was moved to Monday nights at 8:00 p.m. (against the Top 30 hit Cosby) in the second season, the show experienced a large ratings fall, sliding from #3 to #71 in one year, bringing in less than 11 million viewers. The ratings failed to bounce back, and in its final season, the show barely ranked in the top 100, prompting NBC to pull it from the schedule in January.  It returned briefly in June, but at the end of the month was pulled from prime-time lineup with five episodes left unaired. One episode, The Gay Parade, remained unaired by NBC (but was eventually shown on Lifetime a few years ago); the final quartet of shows (including the two-part series finale) were burned off from 2:00 to 4:00 am (EST) on December 26, 2000, where they aired during the NBC All Night block.

Reception
On Rotten Tomatoes, season 1 has an approval rating of 55% based on reviews from 11 critics. The website's critical consensus was: "Comedic inspiration doesn't spark Suddenly for this Susan, hampered by derivative gags that undermine Brooke Shields' energetic performance."

Caryn James of the New York Times wrote: "Like its lead character, Suddenly Susan has no identity of its own. The beauty of the magic time slot is that it gives Suddenly Susan, with its engaging star and flexible format, a well-deserved chance to grow."

Ken Tucker of Entertainment Weekly gave it a grade C and called it: "A wearyingly self-conscious updating of The Mary Tyler Moore Show: nice girl trying to make it in the competitive workplace of a big town."

Ratings history 

Twenty-three episodes were produced for season four, but episode 18, "The Gay Parade" was never broadcast.
End of the series' original broadcast run. Last four episodes were aired six months later.

References

External links
 

1990s American sitcoms
2000s American sitcoms
1990s American workplace comedy television series
2000s American workplace comedy television series
1996 American television series debuts
2000 American television series endings
English-language television shows
NBC original programming
Television series by Warner Bros. Television Studios
Television shows about writers
Television shows set in San Francisco